Ocnogyna clathrata is a moth of the family Erebidae. It was described by Julius Lederer in 1934. It is found in Lebanon and on Cyprus and Rhodes.

The wingspan is about 35 mm.

The larvae feed on Ranunculus asiaticus.

Subspecies
Ocnogyna clathrata clathrata (Lebanon)
Ocnogyna clathrata cypriaca O. Bang-Haas, 1934 (Cyprus, Rhodes)

References

Spilosomina
Moths described in 1934